The Selizharovka is a river in Ostashkovsky and Selizharovsky Districts of Tver Oblast, Russia, a left tributary of the Volga. It is one of the uppermost substantial tributaries of the Volga. The settlement of Selizharovo is located near the river mouth.

The Selizharovka is the only outflow of Lake Seliger, the biggest natural lake of the Upper Volga basin. It starts at the southern corner of the lake, at the village of Nizhniye Kotitsy. It flows southeast, crosses into Selizharovsky District, and joins the Volga at the urban-type settlement of Selizharovo. 

The drainage basin of the Selizharovka includes the major part of Ostashkovsky District, south of Demyansky District of Novgorod Oblast, as well as minor areas in Firovsky District of Tver Oblast.

References

Rivers of Tver Oblast